In Greek mythology, Medus or Medeus ( or ) was an Athenian prince as the son of King Aegeus, thus a half-brother of the hero Theseus.

Family 
Medus's mother was the Colchian witch Medea, daughter of King Aeëtes. In some accounts, he was called Polyxenus and his father was Jason, thus a brother of Eriopis.

Mythology

Childhood 
In the account for being the son of Jason, Medeus was raised by the centaur Chiron in the mountains.

Flight from Athens 
As the son of Aegeus, Medus and his mother were driven as fugitives from Athens after Medea plotted against Theseus. Following his mother, Medus was brought by a storm to the court of King Perses of Colchis and Medus was seized by the guards and presented to the current ruler. This Perses was the son of Helios and the brother of the former king Aeëtes. He ruled after the death of his brother but by some accounts, Aeëtes was murdered or deposed by Perses. When Medus saw that he had come into the power of his enemy, he falsely asserted he was Hippotes, son of King Creon of Corinth. Perses carefully investigated and ordered him to be cast into prison to protect his throne from any potential claimants because he feared the prophecy that he should be aware of Aeëtes' descendants (i.e. Medus). Afterwards, sterility and scarcity of crops are said to have occurred.

Witch's scheme 
When Medea came back to her native land in her chariot with the yoked dragons, she falsely impersonated a priestess of Artemis before the king. She said she could make atonement for the plague to appease the gods and she heard from the king that a supposed Hippotes was held in custody. Thinking that the alleged Corinthian prince had come to avenge the injury to his father (i.e. Creon), Medea unknowingly conspired and betrayed her son Medus. For she persuaded the king that he was not Hippotes, but Medus, sent by his father to dispatch the king, and begged that he be handed over to her to be killed as a sacrifice, convinced that he was Hippotes. So when Medus was brought out to pay for his deceit by death, Medea saw that things were otherwise than she had thought, she said she wished to talk with him which Perses agreed. Subsequently, Medea gave Medus a sword and bade him avenge the wrongs to his grandfather Aeëtes, and Medus killed Perses, and gained his grandfather's kingdom. In some accounts, the king was stabbed to death by Medea herself using the sacrificial blade. Another version of the myth states that Medea restored her father Aeëtes to the throne of Colchis after being deposed by Perses.

Aftermath 
When Medus came to rule, he secured the command of an army and advanced over a large part of Asia which lies above the Pontus. Conquering the barbarians that live in that neighboring land, he named Media in honor of either himself or his mother. Medeus was also credited to be the founder of Meda in Ecbatana. Medus met his death while marching against the Indians.

See also
 Madai
 Medes

Notes

References 

 Apollodorus, The Library with an English Translation by Sir James George Frazer, F.B.A., F.R.S. in 2 Volumes, Cambridge, MA, Harvard University Press; London, William Heinemann Ltd. 1921. ISBN 0-674-99135-4. Online version at the Perseus Digital Library. Greek text available from the same website.
Diodorus Siculus, The Library of History translated by Charles Henry Oldfather. Twelve volumes. Loeb Classical Library. Cambridge, Massachusetts: Harvard University Press; London: William Heinemann, Ltd. 1989. Vol. 3. Books 4.59–8. Online version at Bill Thayer's Web Site
Diodorus Siculus, Bibliotheca Historica. Vol 1-2. Immanel Bekker. Ludwig Dindorf. Friedrich Vogel. in aedibus B. G. Teubneri. Leipzig. 1888-1890. Greek text available at the Perseus Digital Library.
Gaius Julius Hyginus, Fabulae from The Myths of Hyginus translated and edited by Mary Grant. University of Kansas Publications in Humanistic Studies. Online version at the Topos Text Project.
Hesiod, Theogony from The Homeric Hymns and Homerica with an English Translation by Hugh G. Evelyn-White, Cambridge, MA.,Harvard University Press; London, William Heinemann Ltd. 1914. Online version at the Perseus Digital Library. Greek text available from the same website.
Pausanias, Description of Greece with an English Translation by W.H.S. Jones, Litt.D., and H.A. Ormerod, M.A., in 4 Volumes. Cambridge, MA, Harvard University Press; London, William Heinemann Ltd. 1918. . Online version at the Perseus Digital Library
Pausanias, Graeciae Descriptio. 3 vols. Leipzig, Teubner. 1903.  Greek text available at the Perseus Digital Library.
Strabo, The Geography of Strabo. Edition by H.L. Jones. Cambridge, Mass.: Harvard University Press; London: William Heinemann, Ltd. 1924. Online version at the Perseus Digital Library.
Strabo, Geographica edited by A. Meineke. Leipzig: Teubner. 1877. Greek text available at the Perseus Digital Library.

Princes in Greek mythology
Mythological kings of Colchis
Kings in Greek mythology
Attican characters in Greek mythology
Asia in Greek mythology
Corinthian mythology
Median people
Children of Medea
Children of Jason